Ring: Infinity (リング ∞) is a visual novel game for the WonderSwan released only in Japan in 2000. The game begins much like the other stories in the "Ring" series do by introducing the player to the "Cursed Videotape". From there, players must find a way to save themselves, or perish.

External links 
 http://www.giantbomb.com/ring-infinity/3030-34677/

References 

2000 video games
Adventure games
Japan-exclusive video games
The Ring (franchise)
Video games based on films
Video games developed in Japan
WonderSwan games
Visual novels
Single-player video games